James Wilkinson (1757–1825) was an American general and politician.

James Wilkinson may also refer to:

 James H. Wilkinson (1919–1986), English mathematician and computer scientist
 J. Harvie Wilkinson III (James Harvie Wilkinson III, born 1944), American judge
 James Kemsey Wilkinson (1906–1997), British businessman, founder of Wilko
 James Wilkinson (Australian politician) (1854–1915), Australian federal politician
 Jim Wilkinson (Australian politician) (born 1951), Tasmanian politician
 James Wilkinson (sailor) (born 1951), Irish sailor
 James John Garth Wilkinson, English homeopathic physician, social reformer, translator and writer on Swedenborg
 Jim Wilkinson (communications), former U.S. government employee who works in the field of public relations
 J. L. Wilkinson (1878–1964), American sports executive
 James Wilkinson, original owner of Wilkinson Sword Company

See also
 James Wilkinson Breeks (1830–1872), Indian civil servant and author